The Burnett House was a historic house in rural White County, Arkansas. It was a two-story I-house with a side gable roof, weatherboard siding, a full-width two-story porch across its front, and a rear ell. The porch was supported by Craftsman-style posts set on stone piers, a likely 20th-century alteration. The house was built about 1870, and typified rural vernacular construction in the county from the period, and was one of the only known examples to survive with the ell.

The house was listed on the National Register of Historic Places in 1992.  It has been listed as destroyed in the Arkansas Historic Preservation Program database.

See also
National Register of Historic Places listings in White County, Arkansas

References

Houses on the National Register of Historic Places in Arkansas
Houses completed in 1870
Houses in White County, Arkansas
National Register of Historic Places in Searcy, Arkansas
1870 establishments in Arkansas